Wireless microphones may operate over various frequencies, licensed or unlicensed depending upon the country.

United Kingdom 
In the UK, use of wireless microphone systems requires a Wireless Telegraphy Act license, except for the license free bands of 173.8–175.0 MHz and 863–865 MHz, sometimes referred to as "Channel 70" (not to be confused with TV Channel 69, which was 854–862 MHz and always required a license from JFMG Ltd although licences are no longer available for that band).

Arqiva purchased PMSE band manager JFMG from ITV in February 2009. JFMG were contracted by communications regulator OFCOM to provide spectrum management and licensing services for programme making and special events (PMSE).  In May 2015 Ofcom made the decision to end the contract with Arqiva and to insource the existing services.

Channel 69 was replaced as the UK mobile radio microphone band by channel 38 (606 MHz to 614 MHz). Licences to use this band are issued on a Shared basis which means that any frequency coordination between multiple users in or around a particular location must be done by those users themselves. All Shared Licence holders have the same rights as each other.

In 2013 the UK communications regulator, Ofcom, held an auction in which the UHF band from 790 MHz to 862 MHz was sold to be used for mobile broadband services. Objections had been raised by Andrew Lloyd Webber and many others.

The Interleaved (also known as White Space) UHF spectrum between 470 MHz to 606 MHz (Channels 21 - 37) and 614 MHz to 694 MHz (Channels 39 to 48) may be licensed on a Site Specific Coordinated basis. Coordinated licences grant the holder exclusive use of particular frequencies or blocks of spectrum at a particular location for a specified period of time. Coordination between users is carried out by Arqiva PMSE as part of the licensing process.

Frequencies are licensed either as regulated (licence required) or deregulated (licence exempt).

United States 
Licenses are required to use wireless microphones on vacant TV channels in the United States as they are a part of the Broadcast Auxiliary Service (BAS).  However, this requirement is often overlooked and rarely enforced by the FCC.  Licenses are available only to broadcasters, cable networks, television and film producers. However, the FCC has issued a Report and Order stating that they now no longer allow Broadcast Auxiliary Service (BAS) devices to operate in the 698–806 MHz portion of the spectrum due to their auction of the 700 MHz band. This change is unrelated to, but commonly confused with, the White Space device debate that is currently taking place in the U.S.

The same Report and Order, issued January 15, 2010, also permits most wireless microphones and other 'low power auxiliary stations' in the "core TV band" (TV channels 2 through 51, except 37) to operate with transmit power up to 50 mW without a license, under a special waiver of Part 15 rules. A rule change to make this permanent is proposed.

There are currently some wireless microphone manufacturers that are marketing wireless microphones for use in the United States that operate within the 944–952 MHz band reserved for studio-transmitter link communications.  These microphones have the potential to interfere with studio-transmitter links, and their use must be coordinated by the Society of Broadcast Engineers.  Licenses in this band are only available to licensees of radio and TV stations, and broadcasters are likely to report unauthorized use in this band due to the high potential for interference.

Changes beginning in 2017 concerning operation on 600 MHz frequencies.  Beginning in 2017, the amount of TV band spectrum available for wireless microphone use is decreasing as a result of the incentive auction, which was completed on April 13, 2017.  A significant portion of the TV band spectrum in the 600 MHz band, including most (but not all) of the spectrum on TV channels 38-51 (614-698 MHz), has been repurposed for the new 600 MHz service band for use by wireless services, and will not continue to be available for wireless microphone use.  Specifically, wireless microphones that operate in the new 600 MHz service band (the 617-652 MHz and 663-698 MHz frequencies) will be required to cease operation no later than July 13, 2020, and may be required to cease operation sooner if they could cause interference to new wireless licensees that commence operations on their licensed spectrum in the 600 MHz service band.  FCC 14-50, FCC 15-140, DA 17-314 Spectrum will continue to be available for wireless microphone use on the other TV channels 2-36 (TV band frequencies that fall below 608 MHz), on portions of the 600 MHz guard band (the 614-616 MHz frequencies) and the 600 MHz duplex gap (the 653-663 MHz frequencies), and in various other spectrum bands outside of the TV bands.  FCC 15-100, FCC 15-99

Australia 
In Australia, operation of wireless microphones of up to 100 mW EIRP between 520 MHz and 694 MHz is on unused television channels and is covered by a class license, allowing any user to operate the devices without obtaining an individual license. The onus, however, is on the user of the wireless microphone to resolve any interference that the use of the microphone may cause to licensed radio communications services. After 31 December 2014 operation will not be allowed in the frequency range 694-820 MHz. See item 22A in the schedule in the class licence

Other countries 
In many other countries wireless microphone use does require a license. Some governments regard all radio frequencies as military assets and the use of unlicensed radio transmitters, even wireless microphones, may be severely punished.

Licensing in European countries is regulated by the Electronic Communications Committee (ECC) which is part of the European Conference of Postal and Telecommunications Administrations (CEPT) based in Denmark.

References

Microphones
Wireless transmitters